Myrceugenia franciscensis is a species of plant in the family Myrtaceae. It is endemic to Brazil.

References

franciscensis
Endemic flora of Brazil
Flora of the Atlantic Forest
Flora of Paraná (state)
Flora of São Paulo (state)
Vulnerable flora of South America
Taxonomy articles created by Polbot